Klaus Mainzer (born 2 February 1979) is a German international rugby union player, playing for the TV Pforzheim in the Rugby-Bundesliga and the German national rugby union team.

Biography
Klaus Mainzer, born in Heidelberg, started playing joining local club Heidelberger TV. In 1998 he signed with SC Neuenheim. Since then he played for the SC Neuenheim. He only played one game for the club in 2009-10 because of contract disputes.

He earned his first cap for Germany in 2000 and played 15 times for Germany since then. His greatest success as a national team player was the promotion to Division 1 of the European Nations Cup in 2008. His last game for Germany was in a friendly against Switzerland in 2007.

On domestic level, he won two German championships with his club team in 2003 and 2004 against DRC Hannover and made losing appearances in the 2001 finals against DRC Hannover and again in 2006 against RG Heidelberg.

Not having played in SC Neuenheim's first team in 2010-11 because of disagreements with the clubs leadership, he joined newly promoted Bundesliga side TV Pforzheim for the 2011–12 season.

Honours

Club
 German rugby union championship
 Winner: 2003, 2004
 Runners up: 2001, 2006, 2012
 German rugby union cup
 Winner: 1999, 2001
 Runners up: 2002

National team
 European Nations Cup - Division 2
 Champions: 2008

Stats
Klaus Mainzer's personal statistics in club and international rugby:

Club

 As of 25 August 2011

National team

European Nations Cup

Friendlies & other competitions

 As of 20 December 2010

References

External links
 Klaus Mainzer profile at totalrugby.de

1979 births
Living people
Rugby union props
German rugby union players
Germany international rugby union players
Heidelberger TV players
SC Neuenheim players
TV Pforzheim players
Sportspeople from Heidelberg